

Ch'iyar Quta (Aymara ch'iyara black, quta lake, "black lake", hispanicized spellings Chiar Kkota and erroneously also Chiar Kkola) is a small Bolivian lake located in the Sajama Province of the Oruro Department near the border to Chile. It is situated at a height of about  inside the boundaries of the Sajama National Park. Ch'iyar Quta lies south-east of the peaks of Laram Q'awa, Milluni  and Kunturiri, south-west of Jisk'a Kunturiri and north of Patilla Pata.

See also 
 Jach'a Kunturiri

References 

Lakes of Oruro Department